Werner Schnitzer (born January 9, 1942 in Donauwörth, Germany) is a German television actor.

Selected filmography
 Derrick - Season 2, Episode 10: "Kamillas junger Freund" (1975)
 Derrick - Season 7, Episode 11: "Pricker" (1980)

External links

ZBF Agency Munich 

1942 births
Living people
German male television actors
People from Donauwörth